Mae Taeng is a town and tambon (sub-district) of Mae Taeng District, in Chiang Mai Province, Thailand. In 2005 it had a population of 4,548 people. The tambon contains eight villages.

References

Tambon of Chiang Mai province
Populated places in Chiang Mai province